The 2008 Tippeligaen was the 64th completed season of top division football in Norway. The season began on 29 March and ended 2 November. Brann were the defending champions, having won their third Tippeligaen championship in 2007. The teams promoted from the 1. divisjon at the end of the previous season were champions Molde, automatic qualifiers HamKam, and play-off winners Bodø/Glimt.

Overview

Summary
Stabæk secured their first ever league championship by defeating Vålerenga 6–2 in the penultimate round. From the 2009 season onwards, the number of teams in the Tippeligaen was expanded from fourteen to sixteen. To accommodate this expansion, only one team faced automatic relegation to the 1. divisjon, as opposed to the regular two, while the three best teams in the 1. divisjon were awarded automatic promotion. As in previous years, there was a two-legged playoff at the end of the season, this time between the thirteenth-placed team in the Tippeligaen and the fourth best team in the 1. divisjon.

Teams

Stadiums and locations

Fourteen teams competed in the league – the top eleven teams from the previous season, and three teams promoted from 1. divisjon.

''Note: Table lists in alphabetical order.

Managerial changes

League table

Relegation play-offs
By finishing 13th, Aalesund competed in a two-legged relegation play-off against Sogndal, who finished 4th in the 2008 1. divisjon, for the right to play in the 2009 Tippeligaen. Sogndal played at home first, decided in a draw held by the NFF. Aalesund won 7–2 on aggregate, thereby securing a new season in the Tippeligaen. Sogndal remained in the 1. divisjon.

Results

Season statistics
Sources: fotball.no , TV 2 Sporten

Top scorers

Discipline

Player
Most yellow cards: 7
 David Nielsen (Strømsgodset)
 Vidar Riseth (Lillestrøm)
Most red cards: 2
 Abgar Barsom (Fredrikstad)
 Jan Michaelsen (HamKam)
 Kristján Örn Sigurðsson (Brann)

Club
Most yellow cards: 48
Strømsgodset

Most red cards: 5
HamKam

Attendances

Source: VG Nett

See also
 2008 1. divisjon

References

Eliteserien seasons
1
Norway
Norway